René Emanuelli (born 1905, date of death unknown) was a French equestrian. He competed in two events at the 1948 Summer Olympics.

References

1905 births
Year of death missing
French male equestrians
Olympic equestrians of France
Equestrians at the 1948 Summer Olympics
Place of birth missing